The 83rd season of the Campeonato Catarinense will begin on January 16, 2008, and ended on May 4, 2008.

Format

First stage
Teams are divided into a groups of twelve teams.
One round-robin, in which all teams from one group play games against all teams within the group.

Second stage
Teams are divided into a groups of twelve teams.
One round-robin, in which all teams from one group play games against all teams within the group.

Third stage
Home-and-away playoffs with the top 2 teams of each stage.

The winner of the third stage is crowned the champion. The champions and the runner up qualify to Copa do Brasil 2009 and the champions qualify to Campeonato Brasileiro Série C 2008. The tree teams with the worst positions are release to Divisão Especial 2008.

Participating teams

Atlético de Ibirama - Ibirama
Atlético Tubarão - Tubarão ²
Avaí - Florianópolis
Brusque - Brusque
Chapecoense - Chapecó 
Criciúma - Criciúma
Figueirense - Florianópolis
Guarani - Palhoça
Joinville - Joinville ¹
Juventus  - Jaraguá do Sul
Metropolitano - Blumenau
Marcílio Dias - Itajaí

¹ Divisão Especial 2007 Champion 
² Divisão de Acesso 2007 Champion

First stage

Second stage

*  Atlético de Ibirama was punished, because of the "fall-fall", realized in the game Atlético x Avaí. The scores were changed from 2x0 to 3x0.

Geral Standings

Third stage

* In Criciúma, because the Criciúma have better Punctuation in the two stages (Stage 1 points + Stage 2 points).

Results

Tablewise

 First Stage Games 
Second Stage Games

Other Divisions

Divisão Especial: 12 Teams
Champion: Brusque - Qualify to Divisão Principal 2009
Runner-up: Juventus
10th Place: Inter de Lages - Release to Divisão de Acesso 2009
11th Place: Grêmio Timbó - Release to Divisão de Acesso 2009
12th Place: Guarani - Release to Divisão de Acesso 2009

Divisão de Acesso: 5 Teams

Champion: Porto - Qualify to Divisão Especial 2009
Runner-up:Videira - Qualify to Divisão Especial 2009

Champion

References 

Campeonato Catarinense seasons
Cat